“The Music School” is a work of short fiction by John Updike that first appeared in The New Yorker on December 12, 1964. The story was collected in the volume of Updike's fiction The Music School: Short Stories (1966), published by Alfred A. Knopf.

Plot

The narrator, who identifies himself as Alfred Schweigen (“Schweigen” means “silent” in German), is informed by a young seminarian that under the papacy of Pope John, parishioners will be permitted to chew the Eucharistic wafer, rather than letting it dissolve in their mouths. Alfred approves the practicality of this innovation.

That morning Schweigen's wife points out an obituary in the newspaper: an acquaintance of Alfred has been murdered at his home by an unknown assailant in front of his children. Alfred remembers that the man, a computer scientist, was affable and entirely inoffensive. The following morning, while waiting for his eight-year-old daughter to complete her piano lessons at a music school, Alfred struggles to reconcile the change in Church doctrine and the murder of a harmless family man.

Alfred finds the mystery of mastering a musical instrument inspiring, though his own musical studies as a youth were never successful. Simply shuttling his daughter to and from her lessons is a joy to him. He reminds himself that he is performing this duty because his wife is visiting her psychiatrist in an attempt to cope with his own sexual infidelity.
Alfred mentally composes literary passages for a novel he intends to write. The narrative he imagines involves a hero (the recently murdered computer programmer), his wife, the man's lover and a psychiatrist. The hero will die at the end. Alfred suddenly breaks off his literary musings. Alfred's psychiatrist has recently inquired as to why he engages in emotional self-flagellation. A vivid memory from Alfred's youth takes shape: He had once made ardent confessions to a priest at a country church, after which he received the Eucharist. The memory momentarily refreshes him.

Alfred's marriage is in shambles, and it occurs to him that it will likely end in divorce. When his daughter rejoins him after completing her music lesson, he is overwhelmed by a sense of profound affection for the child, as well as remorse for his failures as a husband.

Theme and Style

The “music school” refers not only to the pedagogic training of children in the musical arts but, according to literary critic Robert Detweiler, “a pathos-ridden paradigm of the exercises their elders practice in learning life’s notes…Music School is life.” Detwieler points out that the story possesses neither a discernible plot nor a linear narrative, yet conveys “the inevitable sorrows and losses of daily life…”:

Literary critic Charles Thomas Samuels contrasts Updike's earlier epistolary treatment involving  a youthful divinity student in “Lifeguard” with that of the seminarian in “The Music School.”:

Biographer William H. Pritchard offers the following passage from “The Music School” to illustrate Updike's autobiographical declaration concerning the state of his own marriage:

Quoting the same passage, biographer Adam Begley considers “The Music School” a “helpless overview” of marital relationships in American suburbia, a confession of Updike's own guilt-ridden domestic affairs.

Footnotes

Sources 
Begley, Adam. 2014. Updike. Harpercollins Publishers, New York. 
Carduff, Christopher. 2013. Ref. 1  Note on the Texts in John Updike: Collected Early Stories. Christopher Carduff, editor. The Library of America. pp. 910–924 
Detweiler, Robert. 1984. John Updike. Twayne Publishers, G. K. Hall & Co., Boston, Massachusetts.  (Paperback).
Luscher, Robert M. 1993. John Updike: A Study of the Short Fiction. Twayne Publishers, New York. 
Pritchard, Richard H.. 2000. Updike: America's Man of Letters. Steerforth Press, Southroyalton, Vermont.
Olster, Stacey. 2006. The Cambridge Companion to John Updike. Cambridge University Press, Cambridge.  (paperback)
Samuels, Charles Thomas. 1966. The Music School: A Place of Resonance from The Nation, October 3, 1966  in John Updike: A Collection of Critical Essays. 1979. David Thorburn and Howard Eiland editors. pp. 192–195. 

1964 short stories
Works originally published in The New Yorker
Alfred A. Knopf books